Boothi Vikramakesari was a Velir Irukkuvel commander of the Chola Empire. He is best remembered for building the Moovar Koil temple complex, a collection of "Three temples" in the village of Kodumbalur, 36 kilometres from Pudukkottai in Tamil Nadu, India. His family was related to the Cholas by marriage. His mother was a Chola princess Anupama. She is the younger sister of Chola prince Arindama.

Dating
Some scholars and historians identify him as a contemporary of Parantaka I while some others like Venkayya identify him as a sub-ordinate of  Parantaka II. It is more likely that he was a feudatory of Parantaka I as a daughter of his, namely Boothi Aditya Pidaari was married to Arikulakesari, the younger son of Parantaka I.

Moreover, the chief and his family members figure in inscriptions of the Pallava King  Nandivarman III and later in inscriptions of Aditya I, so he seems to have initially been a sub-ordinate of the Pallava King and then a feudatory of the Chola King Aditya I after the latter overthrew the former's son Aparajita. Subsequently, he seems to have continued in service of Aditya I's son Parantaka I. Consequently, his period can be fixed between the latter half of 9th century and beginning of the 10th century.

Personal life

The chief's given name was Boothi and he earned the title Vikramakesari through his exploits. He is also called as Tennavan Ilangovel and Parantaka Ilangovelir in inscriptions. He was born to Irukkuvel chieftain Samarabirama and Chola princess Anupama. Samarabirama is called Yadu vamsa kethu that is the Banner of the Yadu race in the Moovar Koil inscription Two queens of his are known from the same inscription, namely, Nangai Varaguna Perumanar and Karrali. As mentioned earlier, a daughter of his, namely Boothi Aditya Pidaari was married to Arikulakesari, the younger son of Parantaka I. She is known from an inscription from a temple at Tiruchendurai.

Inscriptions

An excerpt of the Moovar Koil inscription is as follows,

Another inscription from the period of Pallava King Ko-vijaya-Nandivikramavarman from Kilur, Tirukovilur taluk, South Arcot district. The script and language of the inscription is in Tamil and paleographically the inscription can be dated to the 9th century,

The following is another inscription from Ghrithasthaneswara temple in Tillasthanam, figuring the queen of Boothi Vikramakesari from the period of Aditya I,

It is of interest to note that among the boundaries mentioned in the above inscription there is an embankment called Karikala-karai.

References

Tamil history
History of Tamil Nadu
Tamil monarchs
10th-century Indian monarchs